The Alexander Romance is an account of the life and exploits of Alexander the Great. Although constructed around a historical core, the romance is mostly fictional. It was widely copied and translated, accruing various legends and fantastical elements at different stages. The original version was composed in Ancient Greek some time before 338 CE, when a Latin translation was made, although the exact date is unknown. Several late manuscripts attribute the work to Alexander's court historian Callisthenes, but Callisthenes died before Alexander and therefore could not have written a full account of his life. The unknown author is still sometimes known as Pseudo-Callisthenes.

Between the 4th and the 16th centuries, the Alexander Romance was translated into Coptic, Ge'ez, Byzantine Greek, Arabic, Persian, Armenian, Syriac, Hebrew, and most medieval European vernaculars. The romance was also put into verse, as in a Byzantine recension of 1388. Owing to the great variety of distinct works derived from the original Greek romance, the "Alexander Romance" is sometimes treated as a literary genre and not a single work.

Versions of the romance
Alexander was a legend during his own time. In a now-lost history of the king, the historical Callisthenes described the sea in Cilicia as drawing back from him in proskynesis. Writing after Alexander's death, the historian and philosopher Onesicritus invented a tryst between Alexander and Thalestris, queen of the mythical Amazons. (Onesicritus was widely criticized even in his own time for his inaccuracies; according to Plutarch, when Onesicritus read the relevant passage to his patron Lysimachus, one of Alexander's generals who later became a king himself, Lysimachus quipped, "I wonder where I was at the time.")

Throughout classical antiquity and the Middle Ages, the Romance experienced numerous expansions and revisions exhibiting a variability unknown for more formal literary forms. Latin, Armenian, Georgian, and Syriac translations were produced in Late Antiquity (4th to 6th centuries).

The Latin Alexandreis of Walter of Châtillon was one of the most popular medieval romances. A 10th-century Latin version by one Leo the Archpriest is the basis of the later medieval vernacular translations in all the major languages of Europe, including Old French (12th century), Middle English, Early Scots (The Buik of Alexander, 13th century), Italian, Spanish (the Libro de Alexandre), Central German (Lamprecht's Alexanderlied, and a 15th-century version by Johannes Hartlieb), Slavonic, Romanian, Hungarian and Irish.

The Syriac version generated Middle Eastern recensions, including versions in Arabic, Persian (Iskandarnamah), Ethiopic, Hebrew (in the first part of Sefer HaAggadah), Ottoman Turkish (14th century), and Middle Mongolian (13th-14th century). In addition to the Alexander Romance of Pseudo-Callisthenes, the Syriac version also includes a short appendix now known as the Syriac Alexander Legend. This original Syriac text was written in north Mesopotamia around 629-630 CE, shortly after Heraclius defeated the Persians. It contains additional motifs not found in the earliest Greek version of the Romance, including the episode where Alexander builds a wall against Gog and Magog.

Greek versions
The oldest version of the Greek text, the Historia Alexandri Magni (Recensio α), can be dated to the 3rd century CE. It was subjected to various revisions during the Byzantine Empire, some of them recasting it into poetical form in Medieval Greek vernacular. Recensio α is the source of a Latin version by Julius Valerius Alexander Polemius (4th century), as well as an Armenian version (5th century). Most of the content of the Romance is fantastical, including many miraculous tales and encounters with mythical creatures such as sirens or centaurs.

Recensio α sive Recensio vetusta:    Wilhelm Kroll, Historia Alexandri Magni, vol. 1. Berlin: Weidmann, 1926
Recensio β:    L. Bergson, Der griechische Alexanderroman.  Stockholm: Almqvist & Wiksell, 1965
Recensio β (e cod. Leidensi Vulc. 93)     L. Bergson, Der griechische Alexanderroman. Rezension β. Stockholm: Almqvist & Wiksell, 1965
Recensio β (e cod. Paris. gr. 1685 et cod. Messinensi 62):    L. Bergson, Der griechische Alexanderroman. Stockholm: Almqvist & Wiksell, 1965
Recensio γ (lib. 1):    U. von Lauenstein, Der griechische Alexanderroman. [Beiträge zur klassischen Philologie 4. Meisenheim am Glan: Hain, 1962]
Recensio γ (lib. 2):    H. Engelmann, Der griechische Alexanderroman.  [Beiträge zur klassischen Philologie 12. Meisenheim am Glan: Hain, 1963]
Recensio γ (lib. 3):    F. Parthe, Der griechische Alexanderroman. [Beiträge zur klassischen Philologie 33. Meisenheim am Glan: Hain, 1969]
Recensio δ (e cod. Vat. gr. 1700, 88v‑89r):    G. Ballaira, "Frammenti inediti della perduta recensione δ del romanzo di Alessandro in un codice Vaticano," Bollettino del comitato per la preparazione dell'edizione nazionale dei classici greci e latini 13 (1965)
Recensio ε:    Jürgen Trumpf, Anonymi Byzantini vita Alexandri regis Macedonum. Stuttgart: Teubner, 1974
Recensio λ (lib. 3):    Helmut van Thiel, Die Rezension λ des Pseudo-Kallisthenes. Bonn: Habelt 1959
Recensio λ (Pseudo-Methodius redactio 1)    H. van Thiel, Die Rezension λ des Pseudo-Callisthenes. Bonn: Habelt 1959
Recensio λ (Pseudo-Methodius redactio 2)   H. van Thiel, Die Rezension λ des Pseudo-Kallisthenes. Bonn: Habelt 1959
Recensio F (cod. Flor. Laurentianus Ashburn 1444),  vernacular:     V.L. Konstantinopulos and A.C. Lolos, Ps.-Kallisthenes ‑ Zwei mittelgriechische Prosa-Fassungen des Alexanderromans, 2 vols [Beiträge zur klassischen Philologie 141 & 150, Meisenheim am Glan: Hain 1983]
Recensio φ:    G. Veloudis,  [ 39. Athens: Hermes, 1977]
Recensio Byzantina poetica (cod. Marcianus 408):    S. Reichmann, Das byzantinische Alexandergedicht nach dem codex Marcianus 408 herausgegeben [Beiträge zur klassischen Philologie 13. Meisenheim am Glan: Hain, 1963]
Recensio E (cod. Eton College 163), vernacular:    V.L. Konstantinopulos and A.C. Lolos, Ps.-Kallisthenes, Zwei mittelgriechische Prosa. Fassungen des Alexanderromans, 2 vols [Beiträge zur klassischen Philologie 141 & 150‑ Meisenheim am Glan: Hain 1983]
Recensio V (cod. Vind. theol. gr. 244):    K. Mitsakis, Der byzantinische Alexanderroman nach dem Codex Vind. Theol. gr. 244 [Miscellanea Byzantina Monacensia 7. Munich: Institut für Byzantinistik und neugriechische Philologie der Universität, 1967]
Recensio K (cod. 236 Kutlumussiu, Athos), vernacular:    K. Mitsakis, "," Byzantinisch-neugriechische Jahrbücher 20 (1970)
Recensio poetica (recensio R), vernacular:   D. Holton, . The Tale of Alexander. The Rhymed Version [. Thessalonica, 1974]

French versions
There are several Old and Middle French and one Anglo-Norman Alexander romances:
Alexandre by Albéric de Briançon, composed  1120.
Fuerre de Gadres by a certain Eustache, later used by Alexandre de Bernay and Thomas de Kent.
Decasyllabic Alexander, by an anonymous author between 1160–70. 
Mort Alixandre, an anonymous fragment of 159 lines. 
Li romans d'Alixandre ( 1170), attributed to clergyman Alexandre de Bernay (also known as Alexandre de Pâris), is based on the translations of various episodes of the conqueror's life as composed by previous poets (Lambert de Tort, Eustache, and more importantly Albéric of Besançon). Unlike other authors of the era who undertook the Alexander saga, he did not base his work on the Pseudo-Callisthenes or on the various translations of Julius Valerius's work. As was common in medieval literature, the project resulted from the desire to improve on the work of others and to offer the complete life of the hero to the public, a theme that is also very present in the cycles of the chansons de geste at the time. Thomas de Kent also (probably) penned a version of the saga, Le roman de toute chevalerie, during the very same decade but independent of Alexandre de Bernay's poem; Alexander's influence on the medieval imagination is thus shown as being as great as, if not greater than, that of other pagan figures such as Hercules or Aeneas.
Thomas de Kent (or Eustache),  1175, wrote the Anglo-Norman Roman de toute chevalerie, which became the basis for the Middle English King Alysaunder.
La Venjance Alixandre by Jehan le Nevelon.
Alixandre en Orient by Lambert de Tort, composed  1170. 
Le Vengement Alixandre by Gui de Cambrai, before 1191. 
Roman d'Alexandre en prose, by an anonymous author, the most popular Old French version.
Prise de Defur, from Picardy  1250.
Voyage d'Alexandre au Paradis terrestre, a French adaptation ( 1260) of the Latin Iter ad paradisum.
The Vow Cycle of Alexander romances includes the Vœux du paon by Jacques de Longuyon, Restor du Paon by Jean le Court, and Parfait du paon by Jean de Le Mote.
Faicts et les Conquestes d'Alexandre le Grand by Jean Wauquelin  1448.
Fais et concquestes du noble roy Alexandre, a late medieval prose version. 
Faits du grand Alexandre by Vasque de Lucène, a prose translation (1468) of Quintus Curtius Rufus's Historiae Alexandri Magni.

English versions
In medieval England the Alexander Romance experienced a remarkable popularity. It is even referred to in Chaucer's Canterbury Tales, where the monk apologizes to the pilgrimage group for treating a material so well known. There are five major romances in Middle English which have been passed down to us and most remain only in fragments. There are also two versions from Scotland, one which has sometimes been ascribed to the Early Scots poet John Barbour, which exists only in a sixteenth-century printing, and a Middle Scots version from 1499: 
King Alisaunder from  1275.
The Romance of Alisaunder (or Alexander of Macedon), sometimes referred to as Alexander A, is a fragment of 1247 lines written in alliterative verse. It was probably written between 1340 and 1370, soon before the beginning of the Alliterative Revival, of which it is believed to be one of the oldest remaining poems. It has been preserved in a school notebook dating from 1600. Alexander A deals with the begetting of Alexander by Nectanebo II (Nectanebus), his birth, and his early years, and ends with the midst of the account of Philip's siege of Byzantium. It is likely that the source for this fragment has been the I²-recension of the Historia de Preliis. Beside that it has been expanded with additional material taken from Paulus Orosius's Historiae adversum paganos, the adverse remarks, which are typical of Orosius, however have been omitted by the poet, whose main concern is Alexander's heroic conduct.
Alexander and Dindimus, sometimes referred to as Alexander B, is also written in alliterative verse. In this respect their way of life resembles the ideal of an aescetic life, which was also preached by medieval monastic orders, such as the Franciscans. The source of Alexander B again is the I²-recension of the Historia de Preliis. 
The Wars of Alexander, sometimes referred to as Alexander C, is the longest of the alliterative versions of the Middle English Alexander Romances. It goes back to the I³-recension of the Historia de Preliis and can be found in the MS Ashmole 44 and in the Dublin Trinity College MS 213. Although both manuscripts are incomplete they supplement each other fairly well. In this version much space is given to letters and prophecies, which often bear a moralizing and philosophical tenor. The letters are an integral part of the Pseudo-Callisthenes tradition. The dominant theme is pride, which inevitably results in the downfall of kings. In The Wars of Alexander the hero is endowed with superhuman qualities, which shows in the romance insofar as his enemies fall to him by the dozens and he is always at the center of action.
The Prose Life of Alexander copied by Robert Thornton,  1440.
The Buik of Alexander, anonymous, attributed to John Barbour, dates to 1438 according to its first printed edition from 1580. 
The Buik of King Alexander the Conquerour by Gilbert Hay, 1499. This work is in Middle Scots.

Hebrew versions

There are three or four medieval Hebrew versions of the Alexander Romance:
A literal and slightly abridged translation from the original Greek is found in the manuscript Parma, Bibliotheca I. B. de Rossi, MS Heb. 1087. This version was also partially interpolated into the Sefer Yosippon in the 10th century.
In the 12th or 13th century, an anonymous translator or translators translated a lost Arabic translation of the Latin Historia de Preliis into Hebrew. This is found in the manuscript Paris, Bibliothèque nationale de France, MS Héb. 671.5 and London, Jews' College Library, MS 145. These may represent a single translation in different versions or else two translations, with the Paris version having been used to complete the London. The translator (or one of them) may have been Samuel ibn Tibbon, who made other translations from Arabic.
In the 14th century Immanuel Bonfils translated the Historia de Preliis directly from Latin into Hebrew. This is found today only in the manuscript Paris, Bibliothèque nationale de France, MS Héb. 750.3, but an illuminated copy once resided in the Royal Library of Turin ( 1880) before being destroyed in a fire.

Syriac versions

The Syriac version of the Alexander Romance is preserved in five manuscripts, the oldest of which was compiled in 1708-09. It is largely based on the Greek Pseudo-Callisthenes version, with slight modifications, such as the addition of Alexander's journey to China.

In Syriac literature in particular, there are other works originally written in Syriac that are often attached to the Alexander Romance manuscripts. These works include the Syriac Alexander Legend, the composition of which is commonly attributed to north Mesopotamia around 629-630 CE, shortly after Heraclius defeated the Persians. The Syriac Legend contains additional motifs not found in the earliest Greek Romance, including the episode where Alexander builds a wall against Gog and Magog. There is also a poem (often wrongly attributed to Jacob of Serugh) based on the Syriac Legend but written slightly later. Finally, there is a shorter version of the Legend and an original brief biography of Alexander.

Slavonic versions

In the Middle Ages and later, on the Balkans and in Eastern Europe, also appeared many translations of the novel in Old-Slavonic and Slavonic languages.

This is how a version in Bulgarian from 1810 begins:

Arabic, Persian, Armenian, and Ethiopic versions
There exist two later Persian varieties which are the Iskandarnameh and the A’ina-yi Sikanderi of Amir Khusrow.

The Armenian edition can be found in "San Lazzaro MS 424 - Alexander romance" (see ).

The Ethiopic version, dated between the 14th and 16th centuries, while ultimately based on the Syriac original, is said to be a translation from a presumed intermediary Arabic version from the 9th century. The Ethiopic version also integrates motifs from the Syriac Alexander Legend within the Romance narrative.

See also
Gates of Alexander
Letters of Alexander the Great

References

Translations
Bürgel, J. Christoph, Nizami. Das Alexanderbuch, Munich: Manesse, 1991.
Favager, D.J. (translator) The Romance of Alexander of Alexandre de Paris (abbreviated translation) Kindle (2021)
Harf-Lancner, Laurence (translator and commentator, edited by Armstrong and al.). Le roman d'Alexandre, Livre de poche, 1994. .
Southgate, Minoo (translator). Iskandarnamah : a Persian medieval Alexander-romance. New York: Columbia Univ. Press, 1978. .
Stoneman, Richard (editor and translator). The Greek Alexander Romance. New York: Penguin, 1991. .
Wolohojian, A. H. The Romance of Alexander the Great by Pseudo-Callisthenes (from the Armenian). Columbia University Press, 1969.

Further reading
Aerts, W. J., et al., Alexander the Great in the Middle Ages, Nijmegen, 1978.
Boyle, J. A., "The Alexander Romance In The East And West", Bulletin Of The John Rylands University Library Of Manchester 60 (1977), pp. 19–20.
Chasseur, M., Oriental Elements in Surat al Kahf. Annali di Scienze Religiose 1, Brepols Publishers 2008, ISSN 2031-5929, p. 255-289 (Brepols Journals Online)
Gero, S., "The Legend Of Alexander The Great In The Christian Orient", Bulletin Of The John Rylands University Library Of Manchester, 1993, Volume 75.
Gosman, Martin, "Le roman de toute chevalerie et le public visé: la légende au service de la royauté". In Neophilologus 72 (1988), 335–343.
Gosman, Martin, "Le roman d'Alexandre et les "juvenes": une approche socio-historique". In Neophilologus 66 (1982), 328–339.
Gosman, Martin, "La légende d'Alexandre le Grand dans la littérature française du douzième siècle", Rodopi, 1997. .
Kotar, Peter, Der syrische Alexanderroman, Hamburg, 2013.
Merkelbach, Reinhold, Die Quellen des griechischen Alexanderromans (Munich, 1977). Cf. his and Stanley Burstein's discussions of the epigraphical fragment SEG 33.802 in the journal Zeitschrift für Papyrologie und Epigraphik, Vol. 77 (1989), 275-280.
Selden, Daniel, "Text Networks," Ancient Narrative 8 (2009), 1–23.
Stoneman, Richard, Alexander the Great: A Life in Legend, Yale University Press, 2008. 
Stoneman, Richard and Kyle Erickson, eds. The Alexander Romance in Persia and the East, Barkhuis: 2012l.
Zuwiyya, David, A Companion to Alexander Literature in the Middle Ages, Brill:  Leiden, 2011.

External links

The Medieval Alexander Bibliographies at the University of Rochester
Text and English translation of the Greek Alexander Romance 
Wiki Classical Dictionary
Is The Source Of Qur'an 18:60-65 The Alexander Romances?
Милетич, Любомир. Една българска Александрия от 1810 год. (= Български старини, XIII). София, 1936
The Wild Man: Medieval Myth and Symbolism, an exhibition catalog from the Metropolitan Museum of Art (fully available online as PDF), which contains material on the Alexander Romance (nos. 5-7)

 
3rd-century books
Alexander the Great